Silence Is Wild is the third album by Swedish singer-songwriter Frida Hyvönen. It was released on 29 October 2008, in Scandinavia, and 4 November 2008, in North America. In Sweden, the album debuted at number nine in the official albums chart, making it her highest-charting album to date.

Track listing
"Dirty Dancing" – 4:06
"Enemy Within" – 3:48
"Highway 2 U" – 4:09
"London!" – 4:03
"My Cousin" – 2:57
"Science" – 3:32
"Scandinavian Blonde" – 2:05
"December" – 4:05
"Birds" – 2:50
"Pony" – 3:05
"Sic Transit Gloria" – 4:08
"Oh Shanghai" – 5:42
"Why Do You Love Me So Much" – 3:12

Charts

Weekly charts

Year-end charts

References

2008 albums
Frida Hyvönen albums
Licking Fingers albums